Liquifury is the fourth studio album by the heavy metal band Hurricane. It was released in 2001 on Frontiers Records. The album arrived eleven years after the band's previous release, and it can be considered a "reunion" effort from the band, although two of the original four band members are absent.

Track listing
 "Intro" – 1:11
 "River Gold" (Kelly Hansen, Jay Schellen, Sean Manning) – 4:04 
 "New God" (Hansen, Schellen, Manning) – 5:00 
 "Heart Made of Stone" (Hansen, Schellen, Manning, Tony Cavazo) – 6:07 
 "It's Your Life" (Hansen, Schellen) – 4:37 
 "Happy to Be Your Fool" (Hansen, Schellen) – 5:58
 "Bleed For Me" (Hansen, Schellen, Carlos Villalobos) – 4:31 
 "Shelter" (Hansen, Schellen) – 4:16
 "In My Dreams" (Hansen, Schellen, Manning) – 5:11
 "Torn" (Hansen, Schellen) – 5:38
 "Shine" (Hansen, Schellen, Manning) – 3:35

Japanese edition bonus tracks
 "Push" – 3:55
 "Promises" – 3:49

Credits
Kelly Hansen – vocals, guitars and keyboards
Jay Schellen – drums, percussion
Sean Manning – guitars
Carlos Villalobos – guitars (Track 7)
Randall Strom – guitars (Track 5)
Larry Antonino – bass guitar

Production
Engineers – Kelly Hansen
Mixing – Kelly Hansen and Jay Schellen

External links
Heavy Harmonies page
Liquifury Allmusic entry

Hurricane (band) albums
2001 albums
Frontiers Records albums